P-town, P'town, Ptown, or P/town is a place nickname that may refer to:

United States 
 Petaluma, California
 Pigeon Town, New Orleans
 Pleasanton, California
 Pomona, California
 Portland, Oregon
 Provincetown, Massachusetts
 Puyallup, Washington
 Pacifica, California

Other places 
 Pune, Maharashtra, India
 Porirua, New Zealand